Philippe Couprie (born 18 July 1962) is a paralympic track and field athlete from France competing mainly in category T54 wheelchair racing events.

Couprie has competed in four Paralympics, winning five medals.  His first games were in Seoul in 1988 Summer Paralympics where he competed in the 400m and 5000m as well as winning bronze in the 1500m and a silver in the marathon.  The 1992 Summer Paralympics proved unsuccessful as despite competing in six events ranging in distance from 400m to marathon he did not win a medal.  At the 1994 Los Angeles Marathon, Couprie and fellow Australian wheelchair racer Paul Wiggins made a pact  that they would finish together, thus causing the first dead heat in the history of the competition. In 1996 in Atlanta he did win medals, a bronze in the 1500m and a gold a part of the French 4 × 400 m relay team as well as competing in the 5000m, 10000m and marathon.  In 2000 he helped the French defend the relay gold medal as well as competing in the 400m, 800m, 1500m and marathon.

References

External links 
 
 

1962 births
Living people
French male wheelchair racers
Paralympic wheelchair racers
Paralympic athletes of France
Paralympic gold medalists for France
Paralympic silver medalists for France
Paralympic bronze medalists for France
Wheelchair racers at the 1996 Summer Olympics
Athletes (track and field) at the 1988 Summer Paralympics
Athletes (track and field) at the 1992 Summer Paralympics
Athletes (track and field) at the 1996 Summer Paralympics
Athletes (track and field) at the 2000 Summer Paralympics
Medalists at the 1988 Summer Paralympics
Medalists at the 1996 Summer Paralympics
Medalists at the 2000 Summer Paralympics
Paralympic medalists in athletics (track and field)